Three Bugs Fringe Theatre (or 3BUGS) is a society of the University of Birmingham Guild of Students.  Set up in 2003 by Stephen Makin and Michael Wood, its primary purpose is to allow University of Birmingham Students to take productions to the Edinburgh Festival Fringe each summer.

2015 productions

In 2015 3Bugs performed a sell out physical theatre production of Philip Ridley's The Fastest Clock in the Universe in a renovated warehouse container at Minerva works in Digbeth. Directed by Beatrice Updegraff & Arianne Brooks, produced by Catherine Butler, choreography by Jessica Barber and starring Joel Heritage as Cougar Glass, William Jackson as Captain Tock, Jack Alexander as Foxtrot Darling, Alice Hodgson as Sherbet Gravel and Maya Whatton as Cheetah Bee.

In March 2015 3Bugs also performed Lucy Prebble's 'The Effect' in the Guild of Students. Directed by Beth Kapilla, produced by Rickey Carey and Euan Codrington and starring Jack Alexander as Tristan, Emily Anderson as Connie, Vita Fox and Dr Lorna James and Benjamin Firth as Dr Toby Sealey.

2009 Edinburgh Fringe 

In 2009, 3BUGS had their most successful festival yet with successes of both Ophelia (Drowning) and Baba Yaga Bony Legs.

Ophelia (Drowning) was adapted and directed by Daniel Marchese Robinson and Daniel Pitt from Deborah Levy's Pushing the Prince into Denmark script with excerpts from Shakespeare's Hamlet. It was performed in the swimming pool of the Apex International Hotel, Edinburgh and was inspired by Millias's painting Ophelia. Ophelia (Drowning) received huge press attention after being photographed for The Guardian newspaper on the first day of the festival and sold out every performance. Reviews ranged from 5* from ThreeWeeks, to 4* from The Scotsman, The Telegraph, British Theatre Guide and Fringe Review, with some 3*.

Baba Yaga Bony Legs was written by Polly Tisdall and Sian Warde and told the Russian folk tale, Baba Yaga entirely in the dark and received 4* from ThreeWeeks.

2008 Edinburgh Fringe 

In 2008, 3Bugs Fringe Theatre's contribution to the Edinburgh Fringe Festival was a tenth anniversary production of Crave by Sarah Kane, and ex-Birmingham MPhil Playwriting student, to great success and much press coverage.

Directed by Daniel Pitt

Reviews

5* Three Weeks

4* British Theatre Guide 

Crave was also recorded for a documentary on BBC Radio Four on Sarah Kane's life and work.

And it was mentioned in the Comedy 365 podcast for Wednesday 18 August 8

Past productions at the Edinburgh Festival Fringe 

In 2003 Three Bugs' production of Skin, written and directed by Michael Wood and Stephen Makin, took place at the Edinburgh Festival Fringe. In 2004 a three star production of David Adey's original piece Laius took place at the Fringe, as well as Makin's second project.  Steven Berkoff's Metamorphosis was performed outside on scaffolding at the new Greenside venue, receiving a four star review from the Fringe dedicated magazine ThreeWeeks.  In a first for the society, it also toured Britain, stopping at the University of Birmingham Guild of Students, the Crescent Theatre in Birmingham as part of the Birmingham Festival, and the cornerHOUSE in Surbiton, Surrey.  By 2005, Three Bugs had four shows at the Festival.  Kitty MacDonald wrote and directed Neverland, a musical based upon Peter Pan, to a four star review.  C venues hosted Sam Luck's production of the Dario Fo play Accidental Death of an Anarchist (three stars, ThreeWeeks).  In a directorial debut, Alex Kentish directed Charlotte Keatley's My Mother Said I Never Should, receiving three stars from ThreeWeeks.  In the company's second tour, Alex Freeman and Becky Sandy took Five Kinds of Silence to Birmingham, Sunderland and the Greenside venue in Edinburgh, receiving three stars in two different publications. In 2006 Three Bugs performed Grimm Tales by Carol Ann Duffy at the Edinburgh Fringe Festival, with a cast of talented young University of Birmingham actors, including Pamela Lingham.

External links 
Official Three Bugs Fringe Theatre Website

Theatre companies in England